Dana Lewis may refer to:

Dana Lewis (basketball) (born 1949), American basketball player
Dana Lewis (broadcaster), Canadian broadcaster